The Moloma is a river in Kirov Oblast in Russia, a right tributary of the Vyatka. The Moloma freezes up in early November and stays icebound until late April.

References

Rivers of Kirov Oblast